David Michel (born August 8, 1974) is an American politician who is a member of the Connecticut House of Representatives from the 146th district in Fairfield County. He was born in Nevers, France. His mother, Annie Michel (French/American), has been a teacher and serves as an elected representative of the French abroad for Social Affairs. His father, Jacques Michel (French/American born in Australia), has been a commissioned agent in the Steel industry most of his life after his role as Director of Sales for a prominent French Steel manufacturer. David Michel is currently a distributing agent in the fashion eyewear industry and works with a team of sales representatives across the US & Canada. He has a background in activism, peaceful direct action, social justice, and Environmental organizing. Representative Michel was pushed to run by the communities he helped as an advocate on the very same issues, encompassing environmental justice, healthcare reform, housing reform, mental health support, protecting biodiversity, bringing manufacturing and careers home, creating the CT Offshore Wind Commission for Environmental Standards, food access, and more. He also Co-Chairs the CT Animal Advocacy Caucus with his colleague State Representative Nicole Klarides-Ditria.

Political career

Election
Michel won a primary election on August 14, 2018, winning 68.5 percent of the vote over 31.5 percent of Democratic incumbent Terry Adams. 

Michel was elected in the general election on November 6, 2018, winning 72 percent of the vote over 28 percent of Republican candidate Dan Pannone.

Michel was re-elected in the general election on November 3, 2020, winning 70.5 percent of the vote over 29.5 percent of Republican candidate George Hallenbeck.

References

 Connecticut Democrats
Michel, David 
Living people
21st-century American politicians
1974 births